Diego Schwartzman and Horacio Zeballos were the defending champions, but they did not participate this year.

Robin Haase and Aisam-ul-Haq Qureshi won the title, defeating Nicholas Monroe and Artem Sitak in the final, 6–1, 6–2.

Seeds

Draw

References
 Main Draw

Open du Pays d'Aix - Doubles
2015 Doubles